Vladimir Orlić is a Serbian politician serving as president of the National Assembly of Serbia since 2022. A member of the Serbian Progressive Party (SNS), he has served in the National Assembly of Serbia since 2014. He has been serving as the vice president of SNS since November 2021.

Early life and career
Orlić was born in Belgrade, in what was then the Socialist Republic of Serbia in the Socialist Federal Republic of Yugoslavia. He graduated from the University of Belgrade School of Electrical Engineering in 2007 and received a Ph.D. from the same institution in 2012. He has published over seventy scientific papers, worked in research and development for Imtel, and worked at the Vlatacom Research and Development Institute beginning in 2012. He is also a member of the poet's association of Čukarica.

Politician
Orlić joined the Progressive Party on its formation in 2008. He became a member of its presidency in 2017. In November 2021, he was elected as one of the vice presidents.

Parliamentarian
Orlić received the eighty-third position on the Progressive Party's Aleksandar Vučić — Future We Believe In list for the 2014 parliamentary election and was elected when the list won a landslide victory with 158 out of 250 mandates. He was promoted to the forty-fourth position in the 2016 election and was re-elected when the Progressives and their allies won a second consecutive majority with 131 mandates. 

Orlić served as deputy leader of the Progressive Party's parliamentary group in the 2016–20 parliament. He was also the chair of the European Union–Serbia committee on stabilization and association; a member of the assembly committee on spatial planning, transport, infrastructure, and telecommunications; a member of the committee on education, science, technological development and the information society; a member of Serbia's delegation to the Parliamentary Assembly of the Organization for Security and Co-operation in Europe (OSCE PA); the head of Serbia's parliamentary friendship groups with Argentina, North Korea, and South Africa; and a member of the parliamentary friendship groups with China, Egypt, Ghana, Indonesia, Israel, Russia, the United States of Africa, and the countries of Sub-Saharan Africa.

He received the thirty-first position on the Progressive Party's list in the 2020 Serbian parliamentary election and was elected to a third term when the list won a landslide majority with 188 mandates. There were rumours that he would be chosen as speaker of the assembly following the election, but he was instead chosen as a deputy speaker. He is also a member of the committee on the rights of the child and continues to chair the committee on stabilization and association.

Municipal politics
Orlić received the fifty-ninth position on the party's electoral list for the Assembly of the City of Belgrade in the 2012 local election. The list won thirty-seven mandates and he was not returned. 

He was subsequently given the seventy-fourth list position for the 2014 Belgrade election. The Progressive Party and its allies won a majority victory with sixty-three out of 110 seats; Orlić did not initially receive a mandate but was able to take his seat on 8 September 2016 as a replacement for another party member. He was re-elected in the 2018 municipal election after being promoted to the thirtieth list position, as the Progressives and their allies won a second majority.

He also received the fifth position on the Progressive Party's list for the Čukarica municipal assembly in the 2016 Serbian municipal elections and was elected when the list won twenty-one mandates. He resigned on 3 June 2016.

References

1983 births
Living people
Politicians from Belgrade
Members of the City Assembly of Belgrade
Members of the National Assembly (Serbia)
Presidents of the National Assembly (Serbia)
Members of the Parliamentary Assembly of the Organization for Security and Co-operation in Europe
Serbian Progressive Party politicians
University of Belgrade School of Electrical Engineering alumni